The 2006 Tour of Britain took place in Great Britain from 29 August to 3 September 2006.

Stages

Stage 1
29 August: Glasgow to Castle Douglas, 

The stage was dominated by an early breakaway of three riders who were never caught, finishing 2 minutes ahead of the peloton.

Stage 2
30 August: Blackpool to Liverpool, 

The stage ended in a mass sprint. During the race, Goss won enough time bonuses in the sprints to take the overall lead from Pedersen.

Stage 3
31 August: Bradford to Sheffield, 

The stage was dominated by a crosswind. Pedersen's teammates split the peloton and ensured his return to the lead, but could not manage to catch Filippo Pozzato, who escaped from the lead group near the finish.

Stage 4
1 September: Wolverhampton to Birmingham, 

Another stage where a group escaped early on, and the peloton was unsuccessful in catching them again. Manning was leading as the race reached the final roundabout but he was sent the wrong way and lost the stage.

Stage 5
2 September: Rochester to Canterbury, 

The riders went on strike, after being led astray by race officials. Their main complaint was poor security. The riders eventually resumed the race, and the stage ended in a mass sprint.

Stage 6
3 September: Greenwich to The Mall,  (plus 20 laps of )

There was a number of breakaways on the final stage, but all were eliminated, and the stage ended in a mass sprint.

Final classifications

General classification

External links
Official website

2006 in road cycling
2006 in British sport
2006
2006 sports events in London
August 2006 sports events in the United Kingdom
September 2006 sports events in the United Kingdom